Bateela is a town, and one of twenty union councils in Battagram District in the Khyber Pakhtunkhwa province of Pakistan.

References

Union councils of Battagram District
Populated places in Battagram District